Carmelite Convent English High School is located in Sandor, Vasai taluka, Phalghar district, Konkan region, Maharastra state, India.
Carmelite Convent English High School is one of the best English medium school in Vasai. Situated 3 km away from Vasai station, the school is very spacious surrounded by all green fields. They have a separate huge compound for their fleet of buses. Children from this school are well disciplined, they bring out almost 100% results every year in S.S.C. examinations. Extra curricular activities, outdoor sports and picnics are always conducted in a very organised manner.

External links

Vasai-Virar
High schools and secondary schools in Maharashtra